Taproot is a recording by guitarist Michael Hedges released on the Windham Hill label. It was a Grammy nominee for Best New Age Album.

Reception

Music critic Vincent Jeffries, writing for Allmusic, wrote of the album "The music is touching in its purity and conveyance of honor and affection... With its yearning melodies and expressive yet mature emotional language, Taproot reinforces Hedges' reputation as a gifted, self-realized composer, musician, and human being."

Reissue
The album was reissued in 2011 by Valley Entertainment.

Track listing
All compositions by Michael Hedges except where noted.
"Song of the Spirit Farmer" arranged by E. J. Ulrich.
Lyrics to "i carry your heart" by e. e. cummings.

 "The Naked Stalk" – 1:43
 "The Jealous Tunnel/About Face" – 4:20
 "The Jade Stalk" – 3:55
 "Nomad Land" – 1:54
 "Point A" – 1:33
 "Chava's Song" – 3:14
 "Ritual Dance" – 2:17
 "Scenes (on the road to Shrub)" – 4:23
 "The First Cutting" – 3:02
 "Point B" – 1:57
 "Song of the Spirit Farmer" – 4:45
 "The Rootwitch" – 2:29
 "I Carry Your Heart" (Hedges, e. e. cummings) – 4:55

Personnel
Michael Hedges – guitar, vocals, bass, flute, tin whistle, synthesizer, piano, drums, percussion, sound effects
Michael Manring – fretless bass ("I Carry Your Heart")
David Crosby – harmony vocals ("I Carry Your Heart")
Graham Nash – harmony vocals ("I Carry Your Heart")
Bryan Lanser – percussion, drums ("The Jealous Tunnel/About Face", "The First Cutting")
Mike Moore – clarinet, bass clarinet, saxophone ("The Jade Stalk", "Nomad Land", "Scenes (on the road to Shrub)")
Mindy Rosenfeld – unspecified
Produced by Michael Hedges
Mastered by Bernie Grundman

References 

1990 albums
Michael Hedges albums
Windham Hill Records albums